The 1980 Pacific Lutheran Lutes football team was an American football team that represented Pacific Lutheran University in the Northwest Conference (NWC) during the 1980 NAIA Division II football season. In their ninth season under head coach Frosty Westering, the Lutes compiled an 11–1 record and won the NAIA Division II national championship.

The team played its home games at Franklin Pierce Stadium and the Lincoln Bowl, both in Tacoma, Washington.

Coach Westering won four national championships at Pacific Lutheran (1980, 1987, 1993, and 1999) and was inducted into the College Football Hall of Fame in 2005.

Schedule

References

Pacific Lutheran
Pacific Lutheran Lutes football seasons
NAIA Football National Champions
Pacific Lutheran Lutes football